McKerrow is a surname. Notable people with the surname include:

Amanda McKerrow (born 1964), American ballet dancer
Bob McKerrow (born 1948), New Zealand humanitarian and writer
Clarence McKerrow (1877–1959), Canadian lacrosse player
James McKerrow (1834–1919), New Zealand astronomer and surveyor
Ronald Brunlees McKerrow (1872–1940), British bibliographer and Shakespearean scholar
Shirley McKerrow (born 1933), Australian politician
William McKerrow (1803-1878), Scottish-born, Manchester-based Presbyterian minister, radical activist and newspaper co-founder

See also
Lake McKerrow, a lake of New Zealand
McKerrow, Ontario
Mount McKerrow, a mountain of Antarctica